The Reporters is a book on the subject of law reporters, written by John William Wallace.

Nineteenth-century reviews
In 1847, J. G. Marvin said of the second edition, revised, of this book:

In 1882, the New Jersey Law Journal said of the fourth edition, revised and enlarged, of this book:

Twentieth-century reviews
In 1988, Bookman's Yearbook said that this book was "well worth using".

Glanville Williams described this book as a "detailed monograph".

The Harvard Law Review said, in relation to Year-Book bibliography, that this book discloses little that is valuable and its accuracy does not stand the test of verification.

References
Wallace, John WM. The Reporters chronologically arranged; with occasional Remarks upon their respective Merits. 2d edition, revised. 8vo. Philadelphia. 1845.
Wallace, John William. The Reporters. Third Edition Revised. T & J W Johnson. Philadelphia. 1855. Digitised copy from Google Books.
Wallace, John William. The Reporters, arranged and characterized by John William Wallace. Fourth Edition. Revised and Enlarged. 1882. Digitised copies    from Internet Archive. 

Law books
American non-fiction books
19th-century books